Réo is a department or commune of Sanguié Province in central Burkina Faso. Its capital is the town of Réo.

Towns and villages

References

Departments of Burkina Faso
Sanguié Province